Frank John Becker (August 27, 1899 – September 4, 1981) was an American business executive and politician. A member of the Republican Party, he served five terms in the New York State Assembly and six terms in the United States House of Representatives from New York.

Early life
Becker was born in Brooklyn son of Maximilian and Eva (Sperling) Becker. He moved with his parents to Lynbrook, Nassau County, Long Island, in November 1905. He attended the public schools of Lynbrook and Brown's Business College, Jamaica, Long Island.

During World War I, Becker enlisted in the United States Army on July 22, 1918, and served until September 22, 1919. He founded a real estate and insurance business in Lynbrook, New York, and was also chairman emeritus of the board of directors of the Suburbia Federal Savings and Loan Association in Garden City.

Political career
Becker was elected to the New York State Assembly in 1944, representing the 1st district in Nassau County and won four more elections before running for the United States House of Representatives. He served in the 165th, 166th, 167th and 168th New York State Legislatures.

In 1952, he was elected to Congress with a 67,000-vote margin. The following election, he was re-elected by more than 45,000 votes. He made headlines in 1964 when he introduced an amendment to the United States Constitution that would allow prayer in schools. In 1962 and 1963, the United States Supreme Court ruled in Engel v. Vitale and Abington School District v. Schempp that mandatory prayer in public schools was unconstitutional. Becker spoke about the amendment saying that he wanted to save the nation from a “curse which has befallen all civilizations that forgot and disobeyed God Almighty.” His measure was voted down.

He later introduced legislation to allow American military courts to try members of the armed services for crimes committed overseas rather than in foreign courts.

He retired from Congress and did not run for re-election in 1964, citing a desire to spend more time with his family and to make room for younger candidates. His margins of victory narrowed in the years leading to his retirement.

Becker voted in favor of the Civil Rights Acts of 1957, 1960, and 1964, as well as the 24th Amendment to the U.S. Constitution.

Becker was a delegate to the 1952, 1956, 1960 and 1964 Republican National Conventions.

Personal life
He married Anne Claire Ferris on June 30, 1923, and they had three children:  Francis X. Becker, who became a justice of the New York Supreme Court on Long Island, Robert G., and Elizabeth Ann. He was an active member in the Veterans of Foreign Wars, the American Legion, and the Knights of Columbus.

Becker died in Lynbrook, New York, on September 4, 1981 (age 82 years, 8 days). He is interred at Long Island National Cemetery, near Farmingdale, Long Island, New York. His family became involved in politics. In addition to his son, Francis, his son Robert was the head of the Nassau County Republican Party for 25 years, his grandson, Gregory Becker, was a member of the New York Assembly while another grandson, Francis X. Becker Jr., was a member of the Nassau County Legislature who ran for both the New York State Senate and the U.S. House of Representatives against Rep. Carolyn McCarthy.

References

External links

1899 births
1981 deaths
Businesspeople from Brooklyn
Politicians from Brooklyn
United States Army soldiers
United States Army personnel of World War I
Burials at Long Island National Cemetery
Republican Party members of the New York State Assembly
Republican Party members of the United States House of Representatives from New York (state)
People from Lynbrook, New York
20th-century American politicians